Downtown, officially City Center Downtown, is an enumeration district in the Major Division of Upper Fort Road, St. John's, Antigua and Barbuda.

Demographics

2011 Population and Housing Census 
City Center Downtown has one enumeration district, 15300.

References 

Populated places in Antigua and Barbuda